America's Children's Museum on Wheels: StoryBus is a children's literacy museum on wheels that visits schools and community events in the Chicago area. Housed inside a 37-foot Winnebago, the bus promotes reading to students at the kindergarten and pre-k levels. Filled with a rotating collection of hands-on interactive exhibits, the StoryBus transports children inside the worlds of favorite children's stories, such as The Little Red Hen, The Three Little Pigs, and Goldilocks and the Three Bears.

StoryBus has a special mission to serve low-income children who too often fall behind in the development of reading skills. StoryBus also provides teachers with an arts-based curriculum to reinforce the StoryBus experience and special training institutes for using the curriculum.

Launched in 2000, the StoryBus is a project of the Dolores Kohl Education Foundation. Members of the Kohl McCormick Academy of Outstanding Educators present at the institutes, mentor teachers at participating schools, and develop the curriculum materials.

External links
StoryBus
Dolores Kohl Education Foundation

Children's museums in Illinois
Early childhood education in the United States
Learning to read
Educational projects
Museums in Chicago
Storytelling organizations
Education in Chicago
Organizations promoting literacy